Indigofera himalayensis, the Himalayan indigo, is a species of flowering plant in the family Fabaceae, native to the western Himalayas. A deciduous shrub reaching , its 'Silk Road' cultivar is readily available in commerce.

References

himalayensis
Garden plants of Asia
Flora of Afghanistan
Flora of Pakistan
Flora of West Himalaya
Flora of India (region)
Plants described in 1958